The 1986 United States elections were held on November 4 and elected the members of the 100th United States Congress. The elections occurred in the middle of Republican President Ronald Reagan's second term. Democrats regained unified control of both chambers of Congress for the first time since the 1980 elections.

In an instance of the six-year itch phenomenon, the Democrats won a net gain of eight seats to recapture control of the United States Senate, taking back the chamber for the first time since the 1980 elections. Democrats won the national popular vote for the House of Representatives by a margin of 7.7 percentage points, making a net gain of five seats. Despite Democratic congressional gains, in the gubernatorial elections, the Republican Party picked up a net of eight governorships, making 1986 the last midterm election until 2022 that the president's party made gubernatorial gains.

The national campaign centered largely around the Senate, where Republicans defended a large freshman class of Senators. Despite sweeping Democratic gains, many of the losing Republicans incumbents lost by small margins. The Republican loss of the Senate put an effective check on any further major conservative legislation during the Reagan administration. The elections also had a major impact on the Supreme Court, as Republican losses helped ensure that Robert Bork's nomination to the Supreme Court would be defeated by the Senate. After the Senate rejected the conservative Bork, Reagan instead nominated Anthony Kennedy, who became a critical swing vote on the court.

See also
 1986 United States House of Representatives elections
 1986 United States Senate election
 1986 United States gubernatorial elections

References

 
1986
United States midterm elections
November 1986 events in the United States